Zhao Jiwei (Traditional Chinese: 趙繼偉; pinyin: Zhào Jì Wěi; born August 25, 1995) is a Chinese professional basketball player who plays for the Liaoning Flying Leopards of the Chinese Basketball Association.

He represented China's national basketball team at the 2015 FIBA Asia Championship in Changsha, China.

Zhao was included in China's squad for the 2023 FIBA Basketball World Cup qualification.

References

External links
Asia-basket.com Profile
NBADraft.net Profile
Zhao to Zhou for the Alley-Oop! - 2015 FIBA Asia Championship - Youtube.com video

1995 births
Living people
Basketball players at the 2016 Summer Olympics
Basketball players from Liaoning
Chinese men's basketball players
Liaoning Flying Leopards players
Olympic basketball players of China
People from Haicheng, Liaoning
Point guards
Shooting guards
Sportspeople from Anshan
2019 FIBA Basketball World Cup players